Only Teardrops is the debut album of the Danish singer-songwriter Emmelie de Forest. The album was released on 6 May 2013 on Universal Music. In late March she signed a contract with Universal Music. The song of the same name won the Eurovision Song Contest 2013 for Denmark.

Critical reception
Owing to her status as Eurovision winner, the album's release attracted a number of reviews from Eurovision fan sites. James Sayer of ESC Views gave it a mixed review, saying that "there is nothing wrong with any of the individual songs, there’s just not a great deal which leaps out of the realms of the ordinary". Angus Quinn of Wiwi Bloggs was of the opinion that "Only Teardrops gets it right most of the time and seems to respect the authenticity of the artist".

Singles
"Only Teardrops" was released as the lead single of the album in Denmark on 22 January 2013, and worldwide on 2 May 2013. The song was a large success in Denmark and reached No 1 in the charts. The song also charted elsewhere in Europe following its Eurovision performance. It reached a new chart position of 15 in the UK Singles Chart on 26 May. "Hunter & Prey" was released as the second single of the album in Denmark on 19 August 2013.

Track listing

Charts

Release history

References

Emmelie de Forest albums
2013 debut albums
Universal Music Denmark albums